Chump Change may refer to:

Chump Change (film), a 2000/2004 film written by, directed by and starring Stephen Burrows
"Chump Change" (Quincy Jones song), the theme from The New Bill Cosby Show and the game show Now You See It
"Chump Change", a song by Albert King, written by Barry Murphy and Eric Morgeson for Groovesville Music, on the album King Albert (1977)
"Chump Change", a song by Pitchshifter from their album Deviant (2000)
"Chump Change", a song by The New Pornographers from their album Electric Version (2003)
Chump Change, a 1996 novel by David Eddie

See also
"Trump Change" (often mistakenly called "Chump Change"), a song by E-40's album The Element of Surprise (1998)